Some mathematicians defined this type incomplete-version of Bessel function or this type generalized-version of incomplete gamma function:

Properties

One of the advantage of defining this type incomplete-version of Bessel function  is that even for example the associated Anger–Weber function defined in Digital Library of Mathematical Functions can related:

Recurrence relations
 satisfy this recurrence relation:

References

Special functions
Special hypergeometric functions
Functions and mappings